Canucks are one of the longest running teams in the Calgary Rugby Union. They have won several provincial titles, and in 2004 were unofficially ranked 76th in the world after completing an undefeated tour of Eastern Europe.

History
The Canucks Rugby Club, is an established club that has been playing in Calgary since 1968. The Canucks were originally formed to provide a uniquely Canadian aspect to the game. The Canucks mandate was to provide a strong, competitively tough team on the field and a definite camaraderie and distinct social atmosphere that fosters friendship, local contacts and enjoyment.

The club successfully continues to pursue those objectives and is well known throughout the province as a well prepared team that is perennially in the top tier of every division. It welcomes all members into its varied social circle.

The Canucks have senior sides in all three divisions in the Calgary and Alberta (Provincial) leagues and are historically some of the strongest in the province, placing all three divisions in the city finals in each since 1999.

Titles
2014
Canucks Tour to Argentina - Gaucho Tour 2014
Canucks Tour to Central America

2009
Division III Provincial Champions 
Division III City Champions

2008
 
Division II City Champions
Division III City Champions
Division III Provincial Champions

2004

Division II Provincial Champions 
Division II City Champions 
Under 19 Provincial Champions 
Under 19 City Champions
Unofficially ranked #76 in the world after an undefeated tour of Eastern Europe, including a win over the Hungarian National Side

2003

Division I Alberta Cup Champions

2002

Division II Spring Cup Champions

2001

Division II Spring Cup Champions 
Division III Provincial Champions 
Division III City Champions

2000

Division I Alberta Cup Champions 
Division III Provincial Champions 
Division III City Champions 
Tour to South Africa

1999

Old Boys Provincial Champions

1998

Division III Provincial Champions 
Division III City Champions

1996

Division II City Champions

1995

Tour to the UK & Ireland

1986

Division I Alberta Cup Champions

1985

Tour to Scotland

1983

Tour to Hawaii

1981

Tour to Northern California

1979

Junior Men's Provincial Champions 
Junior Men's City Champions 
Tour to Ireland

1977

Junior Men's City Champions

Notable past players

External links
Official Site
Calgary Rugby union Site

References
Official Canucks Website

Canadian rugby union teams
Rugby union teams in Alberta
Rugby clubs established in 1968
1968 establishments in Alberta